is a German word generally meaning parliament, more directly translated as Diet of the Realm or National Diet, or more loosely as Imperial Diet. It may refer to:

Buildings and places
 is the specific German word for parliamentary buildings, often shortened to Reichstag, and may refer to:
 Reichstag building, the building where German Parliaments met from 1894 to 1933 and since 1999
 Reichstag dome, an addition to the Reichstag by Norman Foster 1995–1999
 Reichstag, former name of the U-Bahn station at the Reichstag, renamed Bundestag in 2006

Institutions
Historic legislative bodies in German-speaking countries have been referred to as Reichstag, including:
 Imperial Diet (Holy Roman Empire), called the Reichstag from about 15th century, earlier known as the Hoftag (777–1806) 
 Imperial Diet (Austria), first elected parliament of Austria (1848–1849), known as the Reichstag
 Reichstag (North German Confederation), parliament of the North German Confederation (1867–1870)
 Reichstag (German Empire), parliament of the German Empire (1871–1918)
 Reichstag (Weimar Republic), parliament of the Weimar Republic (1919–1933)
 Reichstag (Nazi Germany), pseudo-parliament of the Third Reich (1933–1945)
 Scandinavian parliamentary bodies which bear or bore the name Riksdag are also called Reichstag when referred to in the German language; these words have the same origin.

Historic events
 Diet of Worms, Imperial Diet in 1521 at which Martin Luther was declared a heretic
 Diet of Augsburg, noteworthy sessions of the Imperial Diet in 1530 and 1555

See also
 
 Bundestag, and Bundesrat of Germany, the two legislative bodies in the Federal Republic of Germany
 Reichsrat (disambiguation), roughly "Imperial Council", a smaller more powerful legislative body in several German-speaking countries, similar to the Upper House of a Parliament
 Imperial Diet (disambiguation)
 , the parliaments of Sweden and Finland, the latter called eduskunta in the Finnish language
 , the parliament of Denmark from 1849 to 1953,
 , generic name in Scandinavian countries for various Councils of the Realm,